The Red Bull RB4 is a Formula One racing car with which the Red Bull Racing team competed in the 2008 Formula One season.

Launch
The RB4 is the team's second Adrian Newey-designed car; this car has had the help of Geoff Willis whom the team had recruited from Honda in 2007. The car included the Renault R27-2008 engine, the second year the Renault engine had powered the Red Bull team.

The car was launched at the Jerez Circuit on 16 January 2008, the same day the RB4 was taken for its first shakedown laps by driver David Coulthard, Mark Webber got his first taste of the RB4 at the Valencia Circuit on 24 January 2008, who described the car as "encouraging" and "a big step forward".

Technical developments 

As all teams had to conform to the new set of 2008 regulations, the RB4 had the new standard electronic control unit, produced by McLaren Electronic Systems, that aims to prevent the use of driver aids such as traction control and engine braking.

At the February 1 test at Barcelona, the RB4 sported a radical new fin-shaped engine cover. This was part of the first part of the aerodynamic package changes that most teams would make before the opening round in Australia. Webber drove the RB4 with the "Shark Fin"; Coulthard, however, took out a more normal-shaped RB4.

2008 season

Testing
The RB4 was a contender for "the best of the rest" title in testing for the 2008 season, with both Webber and Coulthard topping the timesheets.

However both drivers had a couple of small incidents, with Coulthard "kissing the wall" between turns 7 and 8 at the Circuit de Catalunya on 19 February 2008, and Webber having some minor kerb damage on the monocoque, which could "not be repaired in time to resume testing" on his first day driving the RB4.

Even considering the setbacks and competitive times, the team and both drivers were making sure but steady progress throughout the 2008 testing season, optimising the RB4 to the new rules and regulations. The team was pleased with the car's performance through the testing season before the season opener in Melbourne.

Vettel testing RB4
Toro Rosso driver and future Red Bull driver Sebastian Vettel had the opportunity of testing the RB4 at the Barcelona test between 18 and 20 February 2008 as Coulthard had a trapped nerve. Vettel tested the car on the 19th, the middle day of testing.

Vettel completed 109 laps, and came in 7th with a time of 1:22.558, the same day Webber came in 17th with a time of 1:23.458 after doing 58 laps. The top driver that day was Lewis Hamilton, in a  McLaren-Mercedes, with a time of  1:21.234 after 81 laps completed.

Livery 
At the Brazilian Grand Prix, Coulthard's RB4 was decorated in the colours of "Wings for Life", a charity dedicated to raising awareness of spinal cord injuries. Coulthard said: "I'm dedicating my last race to the vision of making paraplegia curable." Red Bull received approval from the Fédération Internationale de l'Automobile, Formula One's governing body, to run Coulthard's car in different colours than his teammate Webber.

Complete Formula One results 
(key)

References

External links 

 Official Website 
 Technical Specs of the RB4

Red Bull RB04
2008 Formula One season cars